Aureimonas endophytica is a Gram-negative, aerobic, coccoid rod-shaped and motile bacteria from the genus of Aurantimonas which has been isolated from the plant Aegiceras corniculatum from the Cotai Ecological Zones in China.

References

External links
Type strain of Aureimonas endophytica at BacDive -  the Bacterial Diversity Metadatabase

Hyphomicrobiales
Bacteria described in 2017